Codlea (Transylvanian Saxon dialect: Zäöeden) is a city in Brașov County, Transylvania, Romania.

History

During the 13th century, the Teutonic Order built a fortress known as Schwarzburg ("black castle") near the "Măgura Codlei". The castle's name was first noted in 1265 and was rebuilt for the last time in 1432 by the craftsmen's guild that worked in the town. The city of Codlea is believed to have been also founded by Germans. The fortified church in the city is the largest in the Burzenland historic region.
Codlea was well known for its flowers and was called the city of flowers.

Name
The Romanian name "Codlea" could be a derivation from the Latin *codella, diminutive from Latin coda ‘edge, rearward’ or it could be a derivation from the Slavic cotal ("kettle"), as the Măgura Codlei ("kettle hill") looks like a kettle. In Romanian, Măgura means 'big hill, mound, forest located on a high place'. The hill also provides the Hungarian name of the city Feketehegy ("Black Hill"). The German name's origin is unknown, but there is a theory that it was derived from Zeidler ("beekeeper").

Climate
Codlea has a warm-summer humid continental climate (Dfb in the Köppen climate classification).

Population
1510: 670
1814: 3,264
1849: 3,764
1890: 4,035
 2,680 Germans (67%)
 1,211 Romanians (30%)
 44 Hungarians (1%)
 100 Jews and others (2%)
1930: 5,219 
3,111 Germans (60%)
1,916 Romanians (36%)
 192 Hungarians (4%)
1941: 6,214
1966: 13,075
1977: 22,744
1982: 23,500
1992: 24,620
2002: 24,286
2011: 21,708

As of 2011, 90.2% of inhabitants were Romanians, 5.6% Roma, 2.8% Hungarians  and 1% Germans. As of 2002, 86.8% were Romanian Orthodox, 3.7% Roman Catholic, 3.1% Pentecostal, 2.2% Christian Evangelical, 1% Evangelical Augustan Confession and 0.8% Reformed.

Natives
 Fritz Klein (1888–1945), Nazi SS doctor hanged for war crimes
 Doina Popescu (1938–), volleyball player
 Alexandru Zaharescu (1961–), mathematician

References

External links

 Codlea - Official site
 Codlea - www.info-codlea
  Zeiden - site from Gert Liess
  www.zeiden.de
  www.siebenbuerger.de

Populated places in Brașov County
Castles of the Teutonic Knights
Cities in Romania
Localities in Transylvania
Burzenland